Ronald Wesley Taylor  (born December 13, 1937) is a retired Canadian physician and former professional baseball player; he is a member of Canada's Sports Hall of Fame and the Canadian Baseball Hall of Fame. Born in Toronto, he was a relief pitcher over all or parts of 11 seasons (1962–1972) in Major League Baseball (MLB) with the Cleveland Indians, St. Louis Cardinals, Houston Astros, New York Mets and San Diego Padres. He was a key contributor to two World Series-winning teams: the 1964 Cardinals and the 1969 Mets.

He attended the University of Toronto, where he earned a degree in electrical engineering in 1961; he returned to the university to attend medical school after the conclusion of his baseball career in May 1972 when he was 34. Taylor also served in the Royal Canadian Air Force.

Career

As a pitcher
Taylor entered pro baseball in the Cleveland organization in 1956, attending university during off-seasons. On April 11, the Indians' second game of the regular season, Taylor drew the starting assignment against the Boston Red Sox at Fenway Park. He proceeded to throw 11 shutout innings and collect two hits in four at bats at the plate—one half of the Indians' hit total against Boston starter Bill Monbouquette. But in the 12th inning of the scoreless tie, Taylor loaded the bases with no out, then surrendered a game-deciding, walk-off grand slam home run to Carroll Hardy and was charged with the 4–0 defeat. Appearing in eight games pitched for the Indians, he returned to the minor leagues after May 20 and spent the rest of the year in Triple-A. Then, on December 15, Cleveland traded him to the Cardinals to obtain first baseman Fred Whitfield.

Taylor spent the remainder of his pitching career in the National League. With the  Cardinals, he worked in 58 games and posted nine wins, two complete games in nine starts, 11 saves, and an earned run average of 2.97. The following year, his eight wins and eight saves contributed to the Cardinals' successful, 11th-hour drive to the  National League pennant. In the World Series that followed, Taylor worked in two games and threw 4 hitless innings against the New York Yankees; notably, he went four innings in Game 4 at Yankee Stadium to preserve Roger Craig's 4–3 triumph and get credit for a save. When the Redbirds prevailed in seven games, Taylor earned his first World Series ring.

In 1965, Taylor appeared in 25 games for St. Louis through June 15, then was traded to the Astros for left-handed relief specialist Hal Woodeshick. He pitched poorly in Houston for the next season and a half, winning only three of 11 decisions (with four saves), and logged a nightmarish 6.03 earned run average in 68 total games pitched. On February 10, 1967, former Cardinals general manager Bing Devine, now president of the Mets, purchased his contract and revitalized his career.

Taylor formed half of a formidable bullpen duo with left-hander Tug McGraw, leading the club in games pitched (59) and saves (13), winning nine of 13 decisions, and posting an effective 2.72 earned run average during the regular season. He then pitched 3 innings of scoreless relief in the 1969 National League Championship Series against the Atlanta Braves, allowing just three hits in his two appearances, and gaining credit for a victory in Game 2. Then, in the 1969 World Series against the favored Baltimore Orioles, Taylor worked in two games, surrendered no hits in 2 innings pitched, and saved Jerry Koosman's Game 2 victory that kick-started the Mets' five-game Series triumph. Thus, in his four career World Series games, Taylor allowed no hits and only two bases on balls in seven full innings, with five strikeouts, and faced the minimum of 21 hitters.

Then his contract was sold to the Montreal Expos, who released him on April 20, 1972, without bringing him into a game. Taylor signed with the Padres, but was ineffective in three of his four appearances in a San Diego uniform; on May 14 against Montreal at Jarry Park Stadium, he gave up home runs to Ken Singleton and Ron Fairly in his final major league pitching appearance.

Over his regular-season career, Taylor compiled a 45–43 won–lost record, 74 saves and three complete games in 491 appearances, 474 of them as a relief pitcher. In 800 innings pitched, he allowed 794 hits and 209 walks, striking out 464. His career ERA was 3.93. He posted a .103 batting average (12-for-116) in his major league career. He was good defensively; Taylor made only three errors in 169 total chances for a .982 fielding percentage, which was 27 points higher than the league average at his position. In his post-season career, including the 1969 NLCS, he was 1–0 with three saves and a 0.00 ERA in six games pitched, permitting only three hits in 10 innings pitched.

As a physician
After his playing career ended in 1972, Taylor entered medical school at the University of Toronto, having been inspired to do so after visiting field hospitals while on a USO goodwill tour during the Vietnam War. Taylor received his medical degree in 1977; two years later, he returned to baseball as the team physician of the Toronto Blue Jays, serving in that role for three decades, including during the Jays' 1992 and 1993 World Series championships. He also opened a private practice in Toronto, retiring from medicine in 2014.

Ron Taylor was inducted into the Canadian Baseball Hall of Fame in 1985, Canada's Sports Hall of Fame in 1993, and the Ontario Sports Hall of Fame in 2010. He was appointed a member of the Order of Ontario by the province's lieutenant governor in 2005.

References

External links

Breakfast Television Toronto (2016): Interview with Matt and Drew Taylor about their documentary film, Ron Taylor: Doctor Baseball

1937 births
Living people
Baseball players from Toronto
Canadian Baseball Hall of Fame inductees
Canadian expatriate baseball players in the United States
Canadian sports physicians
Cleveland Indians players
Daytona Beach Islanders players
Fargo-Moorhead Twins players
Houston Astros players
Jacksonville Suns players
Major League Baseball players from Canada
Major League Baseball pitchers
Members of the Order of Ontario
Minot Mallards players
New York Mets players
Reading Indians players
St. Louis Cardinals players
Salt Lake City Bees players
San Diego Padres players
University of Toronto alumni